The Floor Below is an American silent film starring Mabel Normand, Tom Moore and Helen Dahl. It was long thought lost, until a print was found "in the estate of a Dutch collector" by the Nederlands Filmmuseum.

Cast
 Mabel Normand as Patricia O'Rourke
 Tom Moore as Hunter Mason
 Helen Dahl as Louise Vane
 Wallace McCutcheon, Jr. as Monty Latham
 Lincoln Plumer as Uncle Amos
 Charlotte Granville as Mrs. Mason
 Romaine Callender as Ziegler
 Louis R. Grisel as Stubbs
 Willard Dashiell as Managing Editor
 Tex Charwate
 William Black (as W. W. Black)
 Lorraine Harding (according to IMDb)
 Herbert Rawlinson (according to silentera.com)

References

External links
 
 The Floor Below at silentera.com
 

American black-and-white films
American silent feature films
Films directed by Clarence G. Badger
Goldwyn Pictures films
1910s rediscovered films
Rediscovered American films
American comedy-drama films
1918 comedy films
1918 drama films
1910s American films
Silent comedy-drama films
Silent American drama films
Silent American comedy films